The Kannada people or Kannaḍigaru, often referred to in English as Kannadigas, are a Dravidian ethno-linguistic group who trace their ancestry to the South Indian state of Karnataka in India and its surrounding regions. The Kannada language belongs to the Dravidian family of languages. Kannada stands among 30 of the most widely spoken languages of the world as of 2001.

Evidence for human habitation in Karnataka exists from at least the 2nd millennium BCE, and the region is said to have had contact with the Indus Valley civilization. In the 3rd-4th century BCE the land was ruled by the Mauryas and Jainism was very popular. It is said that Mauryan emperor Chandragupta Maurya himself, after abdicating the throne to his son Bindusara, retired to the Shravanabelagola region with his Jain guru. 

Karnataka was directly or indirectly engaged in trade with Rome in the 1st century C.E, as evidenced by the discovery of artifacts such as Roman coins in the region.

After the Mauryas, parts of Karnataka were variously ruled by dynasties who were either ethnically Kannadiga or from the outside. One of its most well-known, the Vijayanagara Empire was founded by Kannada chieftains who were great patrons of Kannada art and literature. The Kadambas, Chalukyas, Rashtrakutas and Hoysalas were some of the other major Kannada kingdoms and dynasties ruling the region.

The Kannada language has written inscriptions since 450 CE. Kannada literature is mostly composed of poems and treatises on religious works. Kannada architecture is dominated by stone-carved sculptured palaces and temples. The ruins of Hampi are a UNESCO World Heritage site.

History

 

The Brahmagiri archaeological site near Chitradurga district, central Karnataka attests to evidence of settlement in the Karnataka region from at least the 2nd millennium BCE. Excavations at the Chandravalli historical site has revealed interaction with Roman and Chinese travelers around the 2nd and 3rd century BCE. Talagunda and Halmidi inscriptions stand as the oldest known full-length inscriptions in Kannada.

The language was once popular from the Kaveri to Godavari rivers as mentioned in the Kannada classic Kavirajamarga of 850 CE. Archaeological evidences show Kannada inscriptions found as far north as Madhya Pradesh (inscription of Krishna III) and Bihar. Karnataka Expansion provides insights to kingdoms of northern India whose originators were from Kannada country.

The major empires and kingdoms, their regal capital and most distinguished kings were:
 Western Ganga Dynasty - Talakadu - Durvinita
 Kadamba Dynasty - Banavasi - Mayurasharma (Mayuravarma)
 Badami Chalukya - Badami - Pulakeshin II

 Rashtrakuta - Manyakheta - Amoghavarsha I
 Hoysala - Belur and Halebidu - Veera Ballala II
 Kalyani Chalukya - Basavakalyana - Vikramaditya VI
 Southern Kalachuri - Kalyani - Bijjala II
 Vijayanagara Empire - Hampi - Hakka, Bukka, Krishnadevaraya
 Keladi Nayakas - Ikkeri - Shivappa Nayaka
 Chitradurga Nayakas - Chitradurga - Raja Veera Madakari Nayaka V
 Haleri Kingdom - Kodagu - Mudduraja
 Kingdom of Mysore - Mysooru - Chikka Devaraja Wodeyar

Minor dynasties that have played an important role in the development of Kannada, culture and polity were Chutus of Banavasi (feudatory to Satavahana Empire), Tuluva Dynasty of Canara, Rattas of Saundatti (Belgaum), Guttas of Guttal (Dharwad region), Banas of Kolar, Nolambas of Nolambavadi, Vaidumbas, Chengalvas, Kongalvas, Sendrakas of Nagarkhanda (Banavasi province), Yalahanka Nadaprabhu Kempegowda, Sindas of Yelburga (Bijapur-Gulbarga), Kadamba of Hangal.

In addition, other well known kingdoms that patronized Kannadiga poets and Kannada language were:
 Eastern Chalukyas
 Kakatiya dynasty
 Seuna Yadavas of Devagiri
 Shilahara
 Kadambas of Goa

Immigrants from Karnataka
In addition to those empires that ruled from the Karnataka region, based on inscriptions and literary evidence historians have discussed the possibility that kingdoms of Kannada origin were established in other parts of India as well.

The Karnata Dynasty (founded by Nanyadeva I) of Mithila and Nepal,
The Chalukyas of Gujarat,
The Chalukyas of Vengi (Eastern Chalukya),
The Seuna Yadavas of Devagiri,
The Rashtrakuta family ruling from Berar (modern Amravati district, Maharashtra),
The Rashtrakutas branch of Gujarat (Lata branch),
The Sena dynasty of Bengal
The Eastern Gangas of Orissa (descendants of the Western Ganga Dynasty)

Culture

Architecture

Architecture and Sculpture has been the epitome of art in Karnataka. The temples of Karnataka had in them many shaili or varieties to credit. A majority of the temples were built using the locally available stones.

Some of the places of interest are:
 Ellora Caves houses the Kailasanatha temple of Ellooru was built by the Rashtrakutas Dynasty and is declared a World Heritage Site by UNESCO

 Elephanta Caves island was a summer resort of Rashtrakuta kings and is declared a World Heritage Site by UNESCO.
 Konark Sun Temple also called Surya Devalaya and Black Pagoda built in coastline of Odisha, India by Narasimhadeva I of the Eastern Ganga Dynasty is declared a World Heritage Site by UNESCO.
 Ajanta Caves have sculptures of Rashrakutas and Badami Chalukyas and is declared a World Heritage Site by UNESCO.
 Hampi houses the ruins of the Vijayanagara Empire and is declared a World Heritage Site by UNESCO
 Pattadakal is a vesara style of Hindu temple architecture, a UNESCO World Heritage Site
 Badami cave temples, a regal capital of the Badami Chalukyas, now famous for its sandstone cave temples
 Aihole is known for its many temples and inscriptions of Chalukya Pulakeshin II in the Old Kannada script
 Basavakalyan, a major centre of social and religious movement in the 12th century by Basava, consists of temples in Chalukyan architecture
 Itagi is home to the Shiva temple built by Vikramāditya. Considered to be the best specimen of Kalyani Chalukyan art, it has as many as 68 decorated pillars, an ornate tower and a doorway of great workmanship
 Lakkundi
 Belur
 Halebeedu
 Shravanabelagola
 Saumyakeshava Temple, Nagamangala
 Lakshminarayana Temple, Hosaholalu
 Mallikarjuna Temple, Basaralu
 Ikkeri
 Keladi
 Banavasi

Pioneer sculptors include:
 Amarashilpi Jakanachari
 Ruvari Malithamma
 Chavundaraya
 Siddalinga Swami
 K. Venkatappa
Modern day contemporaries include visionary architects such as:
 Mokshagundam Visvesvaraya, father of modern Indian engineering, Kannambadi Katte or KRS dam
 Kengal Hanumanthaiah, Vidhana Soudha

Modern Kannada art is primarily influenced by Raja Ravi Varma and his realism. Popular visual arts generally revolve around puppetry. Most traditional religious paintings include works that are very colorful.

These are many of the places where art is displayed.

 Karnataka Chitrakala Parishat
 Chowdiah Memorial Hall
 Gaayana Samaja
 Ranga Shankara
 Nrithya Grama
 Ravindra Kalakshetra
 Gubbi Veeranna Rangamandira
 Janapada Loka
 Rangayana
 Ninasam
 Prabhat Kalavidaru

Music

Dasa sahitya is the literature of Bhakti movement composed by devotees in honor of Lord Vishnu or one of his avatars. Dasa is literally "servant" in Kannada and sahitya is literature. Haridasas ("servants of God") were preachers of Bhakti to Vishnu. The bhakti literature of these Haridasas is collectively referred to as Dasa Sahitya. It is composed in the Kannada language.

The Haridasas richly contributed to the heritage of Karntataka music. They made an indelible impression on the religious and cultural life of Karnataka by spreading the didactic teachings in a musical form to the hearts of the common folk. Like other doyens of Indian classical music, these scholars offered prayer to Vishnu through music, called naadopasana. The Lord is described as Samagana priya, and bhakti through music is the most preferred path to 'reach' Him.

The Haridasa compositions are popularly known as Devaranamas. Compositions like Krishna Nee Begane Baaro, Venkatachala Nilayam, Jagadoddharana, Tamboori Meetidava are some of the many examples of their scholarly work.

Some noted Haridasas or composers of Dasa Sahitya are:
 Purandara Dasa, widely regarded as Karnataka Sangeeta Pitamaha or "Father of Carnatic music"
 Kanaka Dasa, a younger contemporary of Purandara Dasa
 Sripadaraja
 Vyasatirtha
 Vadirajatirtha
 Jagannatha Dasa
 Jayatirtha
 Gopala Dasa
 Vijaya Dasa
 Naraharitirtha

One of the oldest forms of music in the region is Karnataka Shastreeya Sangeetha which has evolved over ages. Both Hindustani and Karnataka variations are respected and nurtured by Kannadigas. Bhavageete and Sugama Sangeetha are some innovations. Other forms of music include Gamaka, Joogera Pada and Lavani. Yakshagana is considered a unique and indigenous form of both music and dance of Karnataka.

Contemporary musical thespians are:

 Pandit Bhimsen Joshi, recipient of the Bharat Ratna — India's highest civilian honor
 Gangubai Hangal, awarded both Padma Bhushan and Padma Vibhushan in 1971 and 2002 respectively
 C. Aswath, recipient of Karnataka Rajyotsava Prashasti for his immense contribution to Bhavageete
 Veene Doraiswamy Iyengar
 Puttaraj Gawai
 Honnappa Bhagavathar
 P. Kalinga Rao
 Balappa Hukkeri
 Mallikarjuna Mansur
 Basavaraja Rajguru
 Veene Sheshanna
 T. Chowdiah
 Sawai Gandharva
 Kumar Gandharva
 Mysore Ananthaswamy
 Mysore Manjunath

Theater

Rangabhoomi or the theater culture is a tradition with Kannadigas. These are called  (plays having wide-ranging stages for performance like Rangamancha staged in either theaters or on streets) and Bayalata. As its etymology indicates, bayalu means open-air field and ata means theater. In southern Karnataka, the eastern and western varieties of Yakshagana are termed Bayalata, whereas in the north, several other distinct genres are included under the name.

Harikathe which covers an entire night is another form where one (or more) person tells a story in an outstanding manner accompanied by music at background. It is a common feature to narrate battles, stories, devotions or vratha in front of temples on auspicious days like Dasara and Maha Shivaratri. Harikathe is a composite art form composed of story telling, poetry, music, drama, dance, and philosophy. Today, late-night Harikathe sessions are organized overseas where Kannadiga population is considerable.

Togalu gombeyaata, is a unique puppet show form of shadow puppetry, Gombe ata involves story telling using character made from dolls, Whose performance is controlled by the humans in the background using invisible threads 

Vasanta Habba (ವಸಂತ ಹಬ್ಬ), which means "spring festival" in Kannada is a cultural festival organized by the Nrityagram foundation in Bengaluru. It is a very popular event and is considered the classical Woodstock of India. First held in 1990, it now attracts the best musicians, dancers and cultural artists from across India. Similarly,'Bengaluru Habba (ಬೆಂಗಳೂರು ಹಬ್ಬ is a congregation of art performances at places in the city which is successfully celebrated every year. It aims to provide aesthetic entertainment to a wide cultural, social and demographic cross-section of the city's people by partnering with corporates and other stakeholders since 2003. In 2006, the Government of Karnataka tried to bring the folklore and art into the city of Bengaluru by initiating Jaanapada Jaatre which was hugely successful and received well by art lovers. It is usually held on select weekends in Lalbagh and other parts of the city.

Some famous theatrical, cinematic and television personalities like T P Kailasam, Gubbi Veeranna, C. Honappa Bhagavathar, G V Iyer, Dr. Rajkumar, Puttanna Kanagal, Kalpana, B. S. Ranga, B V Karanth, Girish Kasaravalli, Shankar Nag, T.S. Nagabharana, T N Seetharam have contributed for its richness.

Dance forms

The mystic and spirited reliving of legends and epics are the major depictions in dance forms. With the theater of battle scenes of heroism, loyalty and treachery, colour and pageantry are the main subjects. More are adapted with the course of nature and seasons adding colour to the harvesting seasons. Tribal forms of dance can be found limited in the regions inhabited by Soligas, of which Pinasee is a traditional dance form. The people of Kodagu in the Western Ghats also have their own dance forms.

Some of the folk dances and classical dance forms in Karnataka include:
Dollu Kunitha, a popular drum dance accompanied by singing
Veeragase, It is vigorous dance which involves very intense energy-sapping movements performed by jangamas 
Kamsale, is a folk dance performed by the devotees of lord Male mahadeshwara with rhythmic instrument 
Somana Kunitha / Chamana kunitha, a Form of mask dance, Somana kunitha is ritualistic performance during the festivals in temples, prominently glorifying village deities worshipped by the people since ages 
Pooja Kunita, A religious folk dance of Karnataka which is performed by holding Shakti devata on the head
Suggi Kunitha, is performed during harvesting festival in Karnataka, Haalakki tribe living in coastal part of north canara perform this dance at the time of holy harvesting festival 
Goravara Kunitha is a treditional dance of kurubas which is dedicated to lord mialara linga 
Yakshagana is a form of dance which is popular in coastal Karnataka  
Bhootha (Gana) Aradhane /Buta Kola, This form of dance is widely performed in coastal regions. A dancer personifying a bhoota (holy spirit) dances around the plinth with sword & jingling bells.
Gaarudi Gombe, where dancers adorn themselves with giant doll-suits made of bamboo sticks
Kolata, a stick dance 
Huttari, is a form of dance performed by Kodavas during harvest festival
Moodalapaya, is the eastern form of Yakshagana which is popular in North Karnataka
Bayalata, featuring stories of Puranas rendered as dance
Bharatanatyam is classical dance of Karnataka, too. It is referred to as Bharata Natya in Kannada. The form was mentioned in the Kannada text Manasollasa, written by Someshwara lll.
Jaggahalige Mela, is performed in hubli-dharwad region on the auspicious occasion of Holi & ugadi
Karaga (festival), is celebrated annually which is dedicated to draupadi, Bengaluru Karaga is a notable event.

Martial arts
The martial arts more prevalent in parts of North Karnataka with Garadi Mane present in every village and a head to train the youngsters into fit individuals. Kusthi, Malla Yuddha, Kathi Varase (which can be seen depicted in Veeragase and similar to sword fighting), Malla Kambha (gymnastics on a pole structure with/without rope) are some of the prominent arts practised.

The Mysore Odeyars arrange kaalaga or fights like Vajra Mushti during Dasara festival which is made less frightening these days as they are publicly staged. Rock lifting, Bull race, Kusthi, and Kabaddi are popular sports.

Yogasana, Praanayama and health-related camps are very popular throughout the state and some of the best Yoga practitioners can be found here. Art of Living is one such organization immensely popular all over the world.

 Malladihalli Sri Raghavendra Swami
 K. Pattabhi Jois

Festivals
Kannadigas celebrate festivals throughout the year presenting the diverse culture and belief of the ethnicity. Festivals have varied reasons to celebrate.
 Agriculture: Upon onset of monsoon, sowing or harvest there are festivals celebrated like Chaandramana Ugaadi (marking of new year), Makara Sankranthi and Huttari.
 Monsoon: Dasara/Navarathri, Ayudha Puja, and Deepavali.
 Puraana: Maha Shivarathri, Varamahalakshmi Vrata, Bheemana Amavasye, Swarna Gowri Vratha, Ganesha Chaturthi, Naagara Panchami, Ratha Sapthami, Krishna Janmashtami, Rama Navami, Vijaya Dashami, Vaikunta Ekadashi, Naraka Chaturdashi, Bali Padyami and others.

In the countryside, a dana jaathre (livestock fair) is held which is a conglomeration of people where a local demigod is worshiped and a ratha or theru (chariots) are moved by the bhakthas and daasoha (free food) is arranged for the visitors.

North Karnataka has a unique blend of Hindu and Muslim brotherhood with people celebrating festivals in unison and exchanging goodwills owing to great revolutionary Shishunala Sharif and Guru Govinda Bhatta who had displayed their religious tolerance and spiritual unity of all religions.

Christmas is celebrated at large in Bengaluru and Mangalooru which host some of the oldest churches and educational institutions of the country. Buddha, Mahaveera, Shankara, Basavanna and Gandhi are remembered on their birth anniversaries.

Cuisine

The cuisine of Karnataka includes many vegetarian and non-vegetarian dishes. One of the earliest Indian books with chapters on culinary preparations, Manasollasa, was from Karnataka, written during the reign of Kannada emperor Someshwara |||. The varieties reflect influences from the food habits of many regions and communities from the three neighbouring South Indian states, as well as the state of Maharashtra to its north. Soopa Shastra is notable medieval Kannada literally work written in 1508 A.D on the subject of Kannada cuisine.

Some typical everyday dishes in Kannadigas homes include Bisi Bele Bath, Jolada rotti, Ragi rotti, Akki rotti, Masale rotti, Saaru, Huli, Benne dose, Ragi mudde, Chitranna, Chapathi, Poori, Avalakki, Puri Usli, Puliyogare (tamarind rice) and Uppittu. Dosa (food) origin is linked to Udupi cuisine. A recipe for dosa (as dosaka) can be found in Manasollasa. Plain and rave Idli, Masala Dosa or Masale dosey and Maddur Vade are very popular in South Karnataka. Neer dosa is a delicacy from coastal Karnataka. Davanagere Benne dose is a notable flavourful dosa.

Among sweets, Mysore Pak, Dharwad pedha, Chiroti, Jalebi, and Belagavi Kunda are well known. Hurnagadab, Karadantu of Gokak and Amingarh, Obbattu (bele hurana holige), Kaayi Kadubu, Kaayi (coconut) Obbattu, Shenga holige, Thambittu (tamta), Karji Kai, Ellu unde, Ginna, Halubai, Rave Unde, Otthu Shavige Kaayi haalu, a variety of Payasa (Shavige payasa, kadle bele payasa, Hesaru bele payasa, Sabakki payasa), Sajjige, and Kesari bat are popular sweets. Indis (chutneys) of Karnataka have a very distinct taste and flavour. Some popular ones include Shenga indi (groundnut), Agashi indi, Karal indi, Inichi indi, and Mavina indi (mango).

Some non-vegetarian dishes include: Dhonne biriyani, Bamboo biriyani, Mutton pulao, Mangalore fish curry, fish fry, Mangalore mutton and chicken Sukka, Mandya naati style Baaduta, Ragi mudde - Koli saaru, rice with Mutton sambar, Egg curry, Pork curry, chicken sambar, or gravy, and Boti gojju, among others.

Clothing

The costume of Kannada people varies from place to place. The Kannadiga male costume mainly includes panche (some tie as Kachche) or lungi (wrapping style depends on the region), Angi a traditional form of shirt and Peta turban worn in Mysuru style or Dharwad style. Shalya is a piece of long cloth which is put on shoulder commonly seen in the countryside. Many use Khadi in their clothing until date of which politicians are prominent ones.

Female costumes include Seere of which Ilakal Seere and Mysore silk are famous. Seere has variations of draping depending on regions like Kodagu, North and South Karnataka and Karavali. Young women in some parts of Karnataka traditionally wear the Langa davani after puberty. Kasuti is a form of embroidery work which is very popularly sought-after art on dress and costumes.

An Urban male costume comprises trousers, a shirt and sandals, while that of females include shalwar and moderate heeled sandals. Jeans are popular among the youth, while new age Khadi/silk printed with art or emblem also find place.

Karnataka has the only village in the country which produces authentic Indian national flags according to manufacturing process and specifications for the flag are laid out by the Bureau of Indian Standards at Hubli.

Literature

Kannada literature is filled with literary figures and pioneers all through. With an unbroken literary history of over a thousand years, the excellence of Kannada literature continues into the present day: works of Kannada literature have received eight Jnanpith awards and fifty-six Sahitya Akademi awards.

Pampa, Ranna and Ponna are considered as three jewels of Old Kannada (Halegannada). Janna was another notable poet of this genre.

Basavanna, Akka Mahadevi, Allama Prabhu, Vidyaranya, Harihara, Raghavanka, Kumara Vyasa, Sarvajna, Purandara Dasa, Kanaka Dasa, Shishunala Shareefa, Raghavendra Swami etc. were pioneers of Nadugannada. All these have been involved with social and cultural movements and hence this was the golden era of literature which brought about a renaissance in Kannada literature. This period was amalgamation of literature works which crossed across boundaries under a vast roof encompassed by art and theater fields. The literature works of Kannada in Navodaya is crowned with eight Jnanpith awards.

Some of the contemporary active institutions of Kannada literature are:
 Kannada Sahitya Parishat
 Academies operating as its wings include Tulu, Konkani, Kodava, and Urdu. A Byari academy is the latest academy opened in Karnataka.

Noted travellers and linguists who contributed during the pre- and post-imperial eras include Germany's Ferdinand Kittel, England's Thomas Hodson, Persia's Abd-al-Razzāq Samarqandī and China's Huen-tsang.

Kannada journalism
Mangaluru Samachara was the first Kannada news publication as early as 1843 by German missionary Hermann Mögling. Followed by Bhashyam Bhashyachar who is credited with publishing the first Kannada weekly from Mysore "Mysuru Vrittanta Bodhini" in 1859 under the royal patronage of Krishnaraja Wadiyar III. Shortly after Indian independence in 1948, K. N. Guruswamy founded The Printers (Mysore) Private Limited and began publishing two newspapers, Deccan Herald and Prajavani. Presently the Times of India and Vijaya Karnataka are the largest-selling English and Kannada newspapers respectively. D. V. Gundappa was notable Kannada journalist, he was awarded third-highest civilian award Padmabhushan in 1974.

List of a few major newspapers:
 Prajavani
 Samyuktha Karnataka
 Kannadaprabha
 Udayavani
 Vijayavani
 Hosa Digantha
 Vishwavani News
 Vijaya Karnataka

Contemporary popular Kannadigas

Spiritual leaders
 Shivakumara Swami, Siddaganga Matha, Tumkur, Karnataka
 Balagangadharanatha Swamiji, Sri Adichunchanagiri Maha Samsthana Math
 Shivamurthy Shivacharya Mahaswamiji
 Taralabalu Jagadguru Brihanmath, Sirigere
 Beerendra Keshava Tarakananda Puri

Gandhian philosophers
 Kadidal Manjappa former chief minister of Karnataka
 H. Narasimhaiah
 Kollur Mallappa
 B D Jatti - former president and vice president of India
 Mailara Mahadevappa- only person from Karnataka to accompany Gandhiji in Dandi salt sathyagraha/march 
 Gudleppa Hallikeri

Modern science and technology
 N. K. Naik - Professor Emeritus at IIT Bombay.
 Raja Ramanna - Indian nuclear scientist and father of the Indian nuclear bomb.
 Dr. M.C. Modi - Ophthalmologist and humanist.
 C. N. R. Rao - Notable Solid-state scientist and chairman of Science Advisory Council of GOI. Recently awarded with India's highest civilian award Bharat Ratna
 K. N. Shankara - Indian space scientist and master in satellite payload technology.
 Shakuntala Devi - Mathematics.
 Vivek Murthy American physician serves as the 19th Surgeon General of the United States.
 Narayan Hosmane - Biochemistry and Cancer research.
 S. K. Shivkumar - Scientist, ISRO telemetry (ISRO), associated with Chandrayaan-1 lunar probe.
 Shrinivas Kulkarni - Professor of astrophysics and planetary science at Caltech, United States of America.
 S. Shankar Sastry - Dean of the College of Engineering at the University of California, Berkeley.
 L. S. Shashidhara - Developmental biologist, geneticist and a professor and chair of Biology at Indian Institutes of Science Education and Research (IISER).
 M. Visvesvaraya - Indian scholar and engineer, who also served as the Diwan of Mysore

Environmentalists
Karnataka is one of the few states which, while a leading contributor for GDP of the country and home for industries, has preserved its forests and wildlife. The evergreen Sahyadri and Western Ghats are home to protected Wildlife of Karnataka. The Kannada culture protects and balances Kaadu (forest) and Naadu (state) as can be seen. Although seen scantly still the state enjoys the diversity owing to tribal sects of Soliga, Badaga, Jenu Kuruba, Hakki Pikki, Lambani, Siddis and other inhabitants of forests. See Appiko Chaluvali.

Noted environmentalists include:
 Ullas Karanth (tiger research biologists/zoologist)
 Tulsi Gowda 
 Saalumarada Thimmakka
 Suresh Heblikar
 Poornachandra Tejaswi (ornithologist / littérateur)
 Snake Shyam
 Krupakar-Senani

Current cricketers
 KL Rahul
 Prasidh Krishna
 Manish Pandey
 Mayank Agarwal
 Abhimanyu Mithun
 Vinay Kumar
 Stuart Binny
 Sreenath Arvind
 Krishnappa Gowtham
 R Samarth
 Shreyas Gopal

Retired cricketers
 Anil Kumble
Rahul Dravid
 Javagal Srinath
 Gundappa Vishwanath
 Vijay Bhardwaj
 Venkatesh Prasad
 B.S. Chandrashekhar
 E. A. S. Prasanna
 Roger Binny
 Sunil Joshi
 Syed Kirmani
 Sujith Somasunder
 Dodda Ganesh
 David Johnson

Culture

Purana
The Puranas describe the region as Kishkindha in the age of the Ramayana. There is also literary evidence that the region of Mysore was called "Mahisha Mandala" after the mythological demon Mahishasura. Parashurama and Hanumantha are some epic characters to be cited relating to this place. Hanumantha (Hanuman) is said to be born in Kishkindha, Karnataka.

Punya Koti
One of the most popular and acknowledged Jaanapada songs is "Dharani mandala madhyadolage" which narrates an incidence between mother cow and an aggressive tiger in a place called Karnataka.

Vishwa Maanava
Karnataka as now can be viewed as a multicultural state – almost all the religions that can be found in India can be found here and there has been lot immigration as well due to which multi-ethnic diaspora can be seen. As the kingdoms provided a safe centres for development of all cultures we can see a huge diversities from region to region. Even the language and dialects varies from place to place. The language has evolved distinctly in both the backyard (folk/basic/prakrutha) and frontyard (refined and related to Samskrutha/Sanskrit) of the culture. It can be said that the major works of Sanskrit have originated and continues to evolve here. Shringeri, Udupi are some of nerve centres. One of the leading examples include a village near Shivamogga where people speak only Sanskrit until date. Bengaluru being Kannada majority has almost all language speakers of India, and kannadigaru are said to be tolerant and welcoming people.

One of the most acknowledged concept is to be a Vishwa Maanava or universal being. In Kuvempu's ideology this has a renowned explanation "Every Child is born as a Vishwa Maanava or a Universal Human. It is we who make him Alpa Maanava or Little Human by putting various constrictions of borders rituals and castes. It hence becomes responsibility of our culture to again make him a Universal Being unbound and free." The Kannadiga culture is known to provide shelter and self-respect to people by owning them and their culture. Two colonies for refugees from Tibet are formed, one near Mundgod and one near Kushalanagara, protecting them from Chinese atrocities. Karnataka has sheltered flood victims of northeastern India like Assam and provided them jobs. One of the easily seen diversity is the surnames which vary from hugely like some may involve names involving a Hindu and Muslim name or having a Hindu Christian name (more found in Mangaluru) or even a Muslim Christian name.

Political sphere
After the Odeyar era who already had established democracy by naming elected representative called Saamantha in southern regions as early as the 19th century, the 1947 partition brought a centre into being under democracy and Karnataka accepted a bicameral legislature. But this was a functionally a failure as there always has been a tug of war from centre and states to an extent that from the 1990s to 2010 there have always been different political parties operating at centre and state. North Karnataka had other problems of getting independence more from Nizams. So there were two spheres. Lack of will and coordination and constant fights have been hallmark of politics which has prevented a regional party/media from arising in the land. Kerala being a neighbour where hugely successful communist ideology in bringing up literacy levels has a backing here and a few naxalite outfits function in Karnataka.

Functional failure of all pillars of democracy even being upper riparian state can be clearly seen in the Kaveri River Water Dispute issue. The failure extended to bureaucracy and Karnataka reached the position of being fourth most corrupt state of India due to political and bureaucratic lobby. Because of this, Lokayukta (see N. Venkatachala) was formed but could not get the required powers to deal with the powerful. In the field of press and journalism P. Lankesh and S. Gurumurthy are some of the noted ones famous for their leftist affiliations.

Caste and Communities
Just like other Ethnolinguistic groups in India, Kannada speaking people also form a number of distinct communities. The two single biggest communities numerically are the Lingayat and the Vokkaliga from North and South Karnataka respectively, while Scheduled Castes make up the largest cohesive group of communities. There are also numerous OBC (other backward communities) including the former pastoralist community of Kuruba, Scheduled Tribes like the Boya/Valmiki, scheduled castes like Banjara and Adi Karnataka. Kannada Brahmins are divided into several communities. Although historically Jainism in Karnataka had dominant presence, Kannada Jains today form a small minority. In Karnataka, 5 communities — Brahmin, Jain, Aryavaishya, Nagarthas and Modaliars — are outside the existing reservation matrix.

Horanadu Kannadigaru
Horanadu Kannadigas (or non-resident Kannadigas) are Kannadigas who have migrated to another state or country, people of Kannada origin born outside Karnataka, or people of Kannada origin who reside permanently outside of Karnataka. N R Narayana Murthy, speaking at the 2011 World Kannada Conference, opined that Kannadigas who move out of the state are respected everywhere. Although the failure in political arena has reflected in the cultural isolation of emigrants, some of the successful functional bodies include Singara (Singapore), Dehali Kannadiga (New Delhi), Mumbai Karnataka Sangha (Mumbai), Mallige Kannada Balaga (Mauritius), North America Vishwa Kannada Association (NAVIKA) and Association of Kannada Kootas of America (AKKA) in the United States have promoted cultural involvement through events such as Kannadotsava. Significant Kannada minorities are found in the Indian states of Maharashtra in Kolhapur, Solapur and Sangli; Tamil Nadu in Nilgiri, Erode, Dharampuri and Hosur; Andhra Pradesh in Madakasira, Rayadurgam, Anantapur, Chitoor and Kurnool; Goa; Kerala in Waynad; and in other Indian states. The Kannadiga diaspora are found all over the world, in countries like the USA, the United Kingdom, Canada, and in the UAE.

Unification of Karnataka

First and Second World Wars
After occupying Mysore, British offered 8 acres & a Rs 75 salary for WWII volunteers from Karnataka. Kannadiga regiments were disbanded after World War II. records, as historians still debate about exclusion of revolts from south of Vindhyas against British Indian Army.

From September 1939 until August 1945, recruitment was done at Regimental Centre at Belagavi for the Madras Regiment, the Mahar Regiment, and the Lingayat regiment.

The post-1947 scene
During the period of British rule, state of Karnataka as it stands today did not exist. Areas that today comprise Karnataka were under as many as 20 different administrative units with the princely state of Mysore, Nizam's Hyderabad, the Bombay Presidency, the Madras Presidency and the territory of Kodagu being the most important ones. In effect, nearly two-thirds of what is now Karnataka fell outside the rule of the Wodeyar kings of Mysore. In addition the proposed state had six neighbours — Goa, Maharashtra, Andhra Pradesh, Tamil Nadu, Kerala — and all had Kannadigas along the borders overlapping these regions.

What this meant for the Kannadigas in these regions was that they were reduced to linguistic minorities wherever they were. Kannadigas in the Hubli-Karnataka region for example, came under the rule of the Bombay presidency where Marathi was the official language. Those in the Hyderabad-Karnataka region came under the Nizam's rule where Urdu ruled, while in Mysore Kingdom, Kannada was the official language.

It was in this backdrop that the movement that first started as a protest against linguistic oppression, soon morphed into one that began demanding a separate state be created consolidating all Kannada speaking regions. This was essentially a movement that was spearheaded by the poets, journalists and writers and was called the Ekikarana or 'Unification' movement.
India gained independence in 1947. The joy of independence soon gave way to disappointment as the new government started dragging its feet on Karnataka Ekikarana movement. Kannada speaking areas now got grouped under five administrative units of the Bombay and Madras provinces, Kodagu, and the princely states of Mysore and Hyderabad. The Akhila Karnataka Ekikarana Parishat met in Kasargod and reiterated the demand for a separate state for Kannadigas.

The ratification in parliament of the recommendations of the Fazal Ali Committee brought joy to the Kannada speaking population that now was merged under the state of Mysore.

On 1 November 1973, under Devaraj Urs as chief minister, Mysore state was renamed as Karnataka since it was felt that Karnataka was more 'inclusive' of all the other regions of Karnataka than the name Mysore.

Kannada unification organisations currently active include:
Karnataka Vidyavardhaka Sangha
Karnataka Ekikarana Samithi
Karnataka Rakshana Vedike
Kannada Chalavali Vatal Paksha

See also

 Kannada film industry
 Kannada language
 Kannada literature
 Kannada poetry
 Karnataka
 Karnataka literature
 List of people from Bangalore
 List of people from Karnataka
 List of people of North Karnataka
 North Karnataka
 Sanganakallu
 Siribhoovalaya - a unique literary work

Notes

References

Further reading
 
 John Keay, History of India, 2000, Grove publications, New York, 
 Suryanath U. Kamat, A Concise history of Karnataka from pre-historic times to the present, Jupiter books, MCC, Bangalore, 2001 (Reprinted 2002) OCLC: 7796041
 Dr. Romila Thapar, The Penguin History of Early India, From Origin to 1300 AD., 2003, Penguin, New Delhi, 
 Altekar, Anant Sadashiv (1934), The Rashtrakutas And Their Times; being a political, administrative, religious, social, economic and literary history of the Deccan during c. 750 AD to c. 1000 AD, Oriental Book Agency, Poona, OCLC 3793499
 K.A. Nilakanta Sastri, History of South India, From Prehistoric times to fall of Vijayanagar, 1955, OUP, New Delhi (Reprinted 2002), 
 R. Narasimhacharya, History of Kannada Literature, 1988, Asian Educational Services, New Delhi, Madras, 1988 .
 Malini Adiga (2006), The Making of Southern Karnataka: Society, Polity and Culture in the early medieval period, AD 400–1030, Orient Longman, Chennai, 
 George M. Moraes (1931), The Kadamba Kula, A History of Ancient and Medieval Karnataka, Asian Educational Services, New Delhi, Madras, 1990 
 Rice, B.L. [1897] (2001). Mysore Gazetteer Compiled for Government-vol 1. New Delhi, Madras: Asian Educational Services. .
 Chopra P.N., Ravindran T.K., Subrahmanian N. (2003), History of South India (Ancient, Medieval and Modern), Chand publications, New Delhi 
Cousens, Henry, (1926), The Chalukyan Architecture of Kanarese Districts, Archaeological Survey of India, New Delhi, OCLC 37526233

External links 
 

 
Ethnic groups in India
Karnataka society
Mangalorean society
Dravidian peoples
Ethnic groups in Kerala
Ethnic groups in Andhra Pradesh
Linguistic groups of the constitutionally recognised official languages of India